Josip Pavić (born 15 January 1982) is a Croatian water polo player who competed in the 2008, 2012 and 2016 Summer Olympics, winning the gold medal in 2012 and the silver in 2016. He was widely regarded as the best goalkeeper in the 2012 Olympic tournament. He was named the best world water polo player in 2012, by FINA.

Pavić was given the honour to carry the national flag of Croatia at the opening ceremony of the 2016 Summer Olympics in Rio, becoming the 24th water polo player to be a flag bearer at the opening and closing ceremonies of the Olympics.

Since 2015, he plays for Greek powerhouse Olympiacos. In 2018, he won the 2017–18 LEN Champions League as captain of Olympiacos and he was voted Final Eight MVP.

Honours

Club
HAVK Mladost

 Croatian Championship: 2001–02, 2002–03, 2007–08

 Croatian Cup:  2001–02, 2005–06, 2010–11, 2011–12
LEN Euro Cup runners-up: 2013–14
Olympiacos

Greek Championship: 2015–16, 2016–17,  2017–18,  2018–19
Greek Cup: 2015–16, 2017–18, 2018–19 
Greek Super Cup: 2018  
LEN Champions League: 2017–18 ;runners-up:  2015–16 , 2018–19

Awards
Member of the Best Team of the Year's 2000–2020  in the World by total-waterpolo
 FINA "World Player of the Year" award: 2012
Swimming World Magazine's man water polo ''World Player of the Year"award: 2012
Olympics Tournament MVP: 2012 Pekin
Croatian Water Polo Player of the Year: 2005, 2011, 2012 with Mladost
Best Croatian Goalkeeper of the Year: 2011–12, 2012–13 with Mladost   
 Best Goalkeeper of 2015 World League
 Best Goalkeeper of 2015 World Championship
Best Goalkeeper of Greek Championship: 2015–16, 2017–18,  2018–19 with Olympiacos
Best Goalkeeper of 2018 Final Eight with Olympiacos
LEN Champions League Final Eight MVP: 2018 with Olympiacos
All-Tournament Team of the 2015 World Championship

See also
 Croatia men's Olympic water polo team records and statistics
 List of Olympic champions in men's water polo
 List of Olympic medalists in water polo (men)
 List of men's Olympic water polo tournament goalkeepers
 List of flag bearers for Croatia at the Olympics
 List of world champions in men's water polo
 List of World Aquatics Championships medalists in water polo

References

External links
 

	

1982 births
Living people
Water polo players from Split, Croatia
Croatian male water polo players
Water polo goalkeepers
Water polo players at the 2008 Summer Olympics
Water polo players at the 2012 Summer Olympics
Water polo players at the 2016 Summer Olympics
Medalists at the 2012 Summer Olympics
Medalists at the 2016 Summer Olympics
Olympic gold medalists for Croatia in water polo
Olympic silver medalists for Croatia in water polo
World Aquatics Championships medalists in water polo
Competitors at the 2013 Mediterranean Games
Mediterranean Games medalists in water polo
Mediterranean Games gold medalists for Croatia
Croatian expatriate sportspeople in Greece
Olympiacos Water Polo Club players
Expatriate water polo players